Pierre Péron (1905–1988) was a French caricaturist, illustrator and printmaker.

1905 births
1988 deaths
20th-century French non-fiction writers
French caricaturists
French illustrators
French printmakers
Peintres de la Marine
Artists from Brest, France
20th-century French male writers